Al Martin (born 1967) is a former baseball left fielder.

Al Martin may also refer to:
 Al Martin (second baseman) (1847–1915), baseball second baseman
 Al Martin (screenwriter) (1897–1971), American screenwriter

See also
 Albert Martin (disambiguation)
 Alan Martin (disambiguation)
 Allan Martin (disambiguation)
 Alfred Martin (disambiguation)